Lake Toho is a small lake in Mono Department, Benin.

In May 2018 there was a mass death of fish in the lake, thought to have been caused by some sort of contamination.

References

Toho